The 1900–01 Ohio State Buckeyes men's basketball team represented the Ohio State University in its third season of collegiate basketball. Their coach was Unknown. They finished with a 1-3 record.

Schedule

|-

References
 

Ohio State Buckeyes men's basketball seasons
Ohio State
Ohio State Buckeyes Men's Basketball Team
Ohio State Buckeyes Men's Basketball Team